, literally "Working Kids, Meister Hamster Team", is a Japanese anime series for young children about hamsters who hold down jobs from firefighting to cooking. The show is produced by Toei Animation and was broadcast at on Sundays from 6:30 to 7:00 am from October 7, 2007, to October 5, 2008, on Japan's TV Asahi. The show was also broadcast from 6:00 to 6:30 pm on Friday every week from November 2, 2007, on BS Asahi, but moved its broadcast to 5:00 to 5:30 pm on Friday of every week since October 10, 2008. Broadcast on BS Asahi concluded after November 14, 2008.

The series has been dubbed and aired in French, Italian, and Catalan as "Master Hamsters". It also aired in the Philippines on GMA 7 under the same title. This was presumably a Tagalog dub and there is currently no info on whether an English dub exists.

Plot 

Gaudi is a master hamster in woodworking. He works in Hoshihama, the City of Masters, with his owner Kaito. He goes to the city with the intention of achivieng the Master Title, the higher category a professional can aim for, and the dream of all hamsters. There, he meets new friends like Sylvie, Jean, Alec and Steve; together they live great adventures. When humans get into trouble, Master Hamsters appear to help them with their skills such as firefighting, cooking or carpentry. If humans knew about their existence they would make their life impossible so, to avoid being exposed, they say there is an invisible hero who solves the city problems.

Characters 

 Gaudi: One-star woodworking master and an architect. Gaudi is fast and quick when working. Sometimes he takes decisions without thinking which lead him into mess. Passionate, enthusiastic and optimistic, Kaito's hamster, whom he considers as his elder brother, also has a great sense for justice. His dream is becoming a Grand Master like his dad Garnier and the Master Superior.
Sylvie: Three-star pastry chef and with more than 1000 receipts in her head, Sylvie is the idol of the Master Hamsters. Cute and smart, everybody falls in love with her. Actually, when she looks at you and says: "S’il vous plaît" with that cute face, is impossible to say no to whatever she asks. Even less if you have just eaten one of her cakes. They are delicious! She's Mizuki's hamster and they are really good friends.
Alec: Firefighter from the burning star, Alec is the stronger of the group and the key of the rescue patrol. Brave and resolute, he never hesitates getting into action, especially when someone's in danger. Also, he is really kind and is always cleaning up Gaudi and Sylvie's messes. He lives at the Master's house. 
Jean: Doctor Master from the brightening star. She understands many languages and she is a computing genius. She is the most romantic of all the hamsters. Her owner is Marina, the prettier girl at school.
Steve: Pilot Master from the shooting star. Steve can control every type of radio-controlled car like if he was a Formula One champion. He is Daisuke's hamster. Handsome and vain, he often argues with Gaudi for his behaviour. 
Master: The Master Superior is the person in charge of giving the Master titles. He is a surprising hamster, a wise man, but also really humorous.

References

 "Master Hamsters". Newtype USA 6 (12) 12. December 2007. .

External links

 はたらキッズ マイハム組 Official page of Toei Animation 

2008 manga
Children's manga
TV Asahi original programming
Anime with original screenplays
Toei Animation television
Shōnen manga